Mahonia bodinieri is a shrub in the  Berberidaceae described as a species in 1908. It is endemic to China, found in the provinces of Guangdong, Guangxi, Guizhou, Hunan, Jiangxi, Sichuan, and Zhejiang.

References 

bealei
Endemic flora of China
Plants described in 1908